Gajin­der Singh Safri (25 December 1950 – 12 January 2020) was the second Sikh to be elected as a Member of Parliament in Afghanistan. He was the brother-in-law of Jai Singh Fani, the first Sikh MP, and secured representation in the 1988 parliamentary election. He fled into United Kingdom after the Najbullah Ministry abdicated power in 1992.

References 

1950 births
2020 deaths
Afghan diaspora
Afghan Sikhs
Afghan politicians